Anonga Nardu Tisam (born 25 April 1982) is a retired Cook Islands international footballer, of Cook Islands and Papua New Guinea decent. He was born in Papua New Guinea and brought up there before relocating to the Cook Islands with his parents in the early 90s. He is the brother of fellow international footballers Nathan Tisam and Tuka Tisam.

International career
Tisam played two games in qualification for the 2004 Olympics, playing 90 minutes in a 9–0 loss to New Zealand and a 3–2 victory over American Samoa. He made his full international debut in 2007 in a 4–0 loss to Fiji.

He has also represented the Cook Islands in beach soccer, playing four games at the 2006 OFC Beach Soccer Championship.

Career statistics

Club

Notes

International

References

External links
 Ano Tisam at FIFA

1982 births
Living people
Cook Island footballers
Cook Islands international footballers
Association football forwards
People from the National Capital District (Papua New Guinea)